The Javan whistling thrush (Myophonus glaucinus) is a species of bird in the family Muscicapidae.
It is found in Java and Bali.

Its natural habitat is subtropical or tropical moist montane forests.

References

Javan whistling thrush
Birds of Java
Birds of Bali
Javan whistling thrush
Taxonomy articles created by Polbot